Fábrica de sueños (English: Dream Factory) is a Mexican media franchise and anthology television series developed by Patricio Wills and produced by Televisa. The series revolves around great classics of telenovelas produced in Mexico during the 1980s and 1990s.

The series revolves around the reboot of great 11 classics of telenovelas produced by Televisa such as Cuna de lobos, Rubí, La usurpadora, El maleficio, Colorina, La madrastra, Los ricos también lloran, Rosa salvaje, Quinceañera, El privilegio de amar, and Corazón salvaje.

Its official catchphrase is Reescribimos La Historia (English: Rewriting History).

Cast members

Overview

La usurpadora (2019) 
 
Based on Inés Rodena's  La usurpadora, the series tells the story of the twin sisters Paola Miranda and Paulina Doria, starring Sandra Echeverría, who meet again when Paola decides to start a new life, together with her lover Gonzalo Santamaría (Juan Martín Jáuregui), forcing her sister Paulina to assume her identity. In her eagerness to disappear, Paola simulates her own death, planning to eliminate Paulina, at a time when her husband, Carlos Bernal (Andrés Palacios), the president of the Republic, is going through a serious government crisis.

Cuna de lobos (2019) 

Based on Carlos Olmo's Cuna de lobos, The series revolves around Catalina Creel (Paz Vega), whose great beauty is only surpassed by her cruelty, will go to any lengths to secure her fortune and bloodline.

Rubí (2020) 

Based on Yolanda Vargas Dulché's Rubí, the series is a sequel that will not only address those aspects known to the public, but will explore what happened to the character years later.

The series is written by Leonardo Padrón and produced by W Studios for Televisa. Camila Sodi stars as the titular character.

Los ricos también lloran (2022) 

Based on Inés Rodena's Los ricos también lloran, the series is produced by W Studios for TelevisaUnivision, and stars Claudia Martín and Sebastián Rulli.

La madrastra (2022) 

Based on Arturo Moya Grau's La madrastra, the series follows Marcia Cisneros who, after spending twenty years in prison for a crime she did not commit, wants to be reunited with her family. While everyone believes she is dead, she sets out on a mission to find the real culprit and get her life back. The series stars Aracely Arámbula and Andrés Palacios.

Upcoming 
Among the next projects scheduled to be released are: A new version of El privilegio de amar produced again by Carla Estrada, El maleficio, and Quinceañera.

Production 
Filming of La usurpadora began on 25 April 2019 and concluded in August 2019. Filming of Cuna de lobos began on 15 April 2019 and concluded in August 2019. Filming of Rubí began on 20 July 2019 and concluded in October 2019. Filming of Los ricos también lloran began on 20 September 2021 and concluded on 2 March 2022. Filming of La madrastra began on 6 June 2022.

References 

Mass media franchises introduced in 2019
Televisa original programming